Xeroplexa olisippensis is a species of air-breathing land snail endemic to Portugal, a terrestrial pulmonate gastropod mollusk in the family Geomitridae.

Description

Distribution and habitat

Xeroplexa olisippensis has its distribution in Portugal, widely spread through the western part of the country, from Porto to Faro. It lives in ruderal habitats, open forest, grassland, edges of rivers even in dunes under the stones or on the stems of vegetation.

References

External links 
 http://luisjavierchueca.com/research-3/candidula-s-l/
 Servain, G. (1880). Etude sur les Mollusques recueillis en Espagne et au Portugal. Saint-Germain: Imprimerie D. Bardin. 172 pp

carrapateirensis
Gastropods described in 1880
Endemic fauna of Portugal